Wildlife World Zoo & Aquarium is a  zoo and aquarium in Litchfield Park, Arizona, United States, near Phoenix. The zoo specializes in African and South American animals, and has Arizona's largest collection of exotic animals. It has a   "safari train", a boat ride through the Australian habitat, a tram through another segment of the African habitat, and several amusement-oriented rides.

The latest section, "Adventureland", opened in February 2016. This added , four rides, and a restaurant.  Separately a new Mexican restaurant, "Zooberto's", was opened.

Safari Park

A 15-acre park featuring an African lion habitat and African birds. Visitors can walk or take a tram through exhibits.

Species in the Safari Park include: Springbok, Spider Monkey, African Lions, Macaws, Capuchin, Fischer's Lovebirds, Sable Antelope, Ostrich, Warthogs, Olive Baboons, Red River Hogs, Ring-tailed Lemur, Spotted Hyena.

Dragon World
Dragon World features animal exhibits featuring large ectotherms.

Animals include,
Sailfin Dragon, Reticulated Pythons, Dwarf Crocodile, Gila Monster, Green Iguana, and Green Anaconda.

Baby Animal Nursery
There are more than 600 species at Wildlife World. The babies available to view change from week to week.

Lory Parrot Feeding
The Wildlife World Zoo features a Lory feeding exhibit. Visitors can interact with tropical birds here from the South Pacific.

Aquarium
The Wildlife World Aquarium is Arizona's first public aquarium, and features salt- and fresh-water species including sea lions and varieties of penguins.

History
In 1973 Ollson purchased  at the current site in Litchfield Park. The zoo grew by breeding and trading animals with other zoos, until by 1984 he "essentially had a zoo no one could visit." The zoo opened to the public that year, and continued to grow by purchasing the surrounding property. The aquarium opened in 2008, and the Safari Park and "American Adventure" opened in 2014.

Gallery

Notes

External links 
 
 

Zoos in Arizona
Buildings and structures in Maricopa County, Arizona
Tourist attractions in Maricopa County, Arizona
Amusement parks in Arizona